In the 1971–72 Kuwaiti Premier League, Al Kuwait Kaifan won the championship.

References
RSSSF

1971–72
1971–72 in Asian association football leagues
football